Pedro Michel López (born April 28, 1984) is a Dominican former professional baseball shortstop. He played in Major League Baseball (MLB) for the Chicago White Sox (2005) and the Cincinnati Reds (2007).

Professional career

Chicago White Sox
In , López was sent to the Arizona White Sox in the Arizona League, a rookie-level professional baseball league. López batted .312, going 62 for 199 in 50 games. He also stole 12 bases and scored 26 runs. He upped his batting average to .319, playing in 63 games, knocking in 83 hits, and stealing 22 bases while scoring 42 runs. In , López was sent to the South Atlantic League, a Single-A league, where he played for the Kannapolis Intimidators. He hit .264 in 109 games with 40 runs scored and 24 stolen bases. At that point, López was promoted to high-A ball with the Winston-Salem Warthogs in the Carolina League. He played only 4 games with the team, and batted 3 for 13. He played in 111 games, racking up 124 hits, scoring 62 runs, and stealing 12 bases. Towards the end of the season, López was promoted to Double-A with the Birmingham Barons in the Southern League. He played the remaining 7 games of the season there and went 5–23 in his first taste of Double-A ball. For the  season, López started again with the Barons and struggled a bit with his hitting, only batting a .238. Regardless of his performance, scouts saw his potential as he was only 21 years of age and playing in Double-A ball. He was promoted to the Charlotte Knights in the International League. He batted .202, getting 38 hits in 188 at bats. Soon after, López was promoted to the big leagues. López made his major league debut on May 1, 2005, and played in two games for the Chicago White Sox. He went 2–7 in with a run scored and 2 RBI. López began the  season with the Charlotte Knights, the White Sox Triple-A affiliate, but was later released by the team.

Cincinnati Reds
On May 21, 2007, he was picked up off waivers by the Cincinnati Reds. He was sent to the Red's Triple-A affiliate, the Louisville Bats. On July 8, 2007, he was called up to the Reds and made his Reds debut on July 14, going 0–3 against the New York Mets.

Post-majors
On October 26, the Toronto Blue Jays claimed him off waivers. He became a free agent at the end of the  season. Lopez signed a minor league contract with the Pittsburgh Pirates on January 6, 2009. He signed a minor league contract with the Washington Nationals on January 13, . Lopez played the 2012 season with the Bridgeport Bluefish of the Atlantic League of Professional Baseball.

References

External links

Louisville Bats profile

1984 births
Living people
Altoona Curve players
Arizona League White Sox players
Baseball players at the 2015 Pan American Games
Birmingham Barons players
Bridgeport Bluefish players
Bristol White Sox players
Charlotte Knights players
Chicago White Sox players
Cincinnati Reds players
Dominican Republic baseball coaches
Dominican Republic expatriate baseball players in Canada
Dominican Republic expatriate baseball players in Mexico
Dominican Republic expatriate baseball players in the United States
Dominican Republic national baseball team people
Dominican Republic sportspeople in doping cases
Estrellas Orientales players
Harrisburg Senators players
Indianapolis Indians players
Kannapolis Intimidators players
Leones del Escogido players
Louisville Bats players
Major League Baseball players from the Dominican Republic
Major League Baseball shortstops
Mesa Solar Sox players
Mexican League baseball shortstops
Mexican League baseball third basemen
Olmecas de Tabasco players
Peoria Saguaros players
Syracuse Chiefs players
Trois-Rivières Aigles players
Winston-Salem Warthogs players
Pan American Games competitors for the Dominican Republic
People from Moca, Dominican Republic